Harry Albert Atkinson (15 October 1867 – 21 January 1956) was a New Zealand engineer, socialist and insurance agent. He was born in Urenui, Taranaki, New Zealand on 15 October 1867, and was educated at Nelson College.

References

1867 births
1956 deaths
New Zealand socialists
People educated at Nelson College
20th-century New Zealand engineers
19th-century New Zealand engineers
Atkinson–Hursthouse–Richmond family